Carlon Blackman (born 27 March 1965) is a Barbadian sprinter. She competed in the women's 400 metres at the 1984 Summer Olympics in Los Angeles, finishing in sixth place in her first-round heat, with a time of 54.26.

References

External links
 

1965 births
Living people
Athletes (track and field) at the 1984 Summer Olympics
Barbadian female sprinters
Olympic athletes of Barbados
Place of birth missing (living people)
Olympic female sprinters